Elios may refer to

Helios (can also be spelled Elios), a minor character in the Japanese Sailor Moon series.
, an Italian steamship seized by the United Kingdom during the Second World War